Rhampsinitus is a genus of harvestmen in the family Phalangiidae.

Species
 Rhampsinitus angulatus Lawrence, 1962
 Rhampsinitus ater Roewer, 1912
 Rhampsinitus bettoni (Pocock, 1903)
 Rhampsinitus brevipalpis Lawrence, 1962
 Rhampsinitus brevipes Kauri, 1962
 Rhampsinitus capensis (Loman, 1898)
 Rhampsinitus crassus Loman, 1898
 Rhampsinitus cristatus Lawrence, 1931
 Rhampsinitus discolor (Karsch, 1878)
 Rhampsinitus echinodorsum Roewer, 1912
 Rhampsinitus ephippiatus Roewer, 1956
 Rhampsinitus fissidens Lawrence, 1933
 Rhampsinitus flavidus Lawrence, 1931
 Rhampsinitus forsteri Kauri, 1962
 Rhampsinitus fuscinatus Roewer, 1956
 Rhampsinitus granarius Roewer, 1916
 Rhampsinitus hewittius (Roewer, 1956)
 Rhampsinitus hispidus Roewer, 1911
 Rhampsinitus ingae Kauri, 1962
 Rhampsinitus keniatus (Roewer, 1956)
 Rhampsinitus lalandei Simon, 1879
 Rhampsinitus lawrencei Starega, 1984
 Rhampsinitus leighi Pocock, 1903
 Rhampsinitus levis Lawrence, 1931
 Rhampsinitus longipalpis Lawrence, 1931
 Rhampsinitus maculatus Kauri, 1962
 Rhampsinitus morosianus Kauri, 1962
 Rhampsinitus nubicolus Lawrence, 1963
 Rhampsinitus pectinatus Roewer, 1956
 Rhampsinitus qachasneki Kauri, 1962
 Rhampsinitus quadridens Lawrence, 1949
 Rhampsinitus quadrispina Roewer, 1911
 Rhampsinitus salti Roewer, 1952
 Rhampsinitus silvaticus Lawrence, 1931
 Rhampsinitus soerenseni Mello-Leitão, 1944
 Rhampsinitus scabrichelis Roewer, 1956
 Rhampsinitus scutiger Roewer, 1956
 Rhampsinitus somalicus Caporiacco, 1927
 Rhampsinitus spenceri Pocock, 1903
 Rhampsinitus spinifrons Roewer, 1915
 Rhampsinitus suzukii H. Kauri, 1985
 Rhampsinitus telifrons Pocock, 1903
 Rhampsinitus tenebrosus Lawrence, 1938
 Rhampsinitus traegardhi Kauri, 1962
 Rhampsinitus transvaalicus Lawrence, 1931
 Rhampsinitus unicolor Lawrence, 1931
 Rhampsinitus vittatus Lawrence, 1931

References

Harvestman genera